is a former Japanese football player and manager.

Playing career
Kimura was born in Fuchu, Hiroshima on April 4, 1957. After graduating from Waseda University, he joined his local club Mazda (later Sanfrecce Hiroshima) in 1983. He retired in 1988.

Coaching career
After retirement, Kimura started coaching career at Sanfrecce Hiroshima in 1995. He became an assistant coach for top team and manager for youth team. In July 2002, he was promoted manager as Gadzhi Gadzhiyev successor, but he resigned end of season. In 2005, he moved to TEPCO Mareeze, but he resigned in 2006. He also managed FC Gifu (2011) and FC Imabari (2012-2015).

Managerial statistics

References

External links

1957 births
Living people
Waseda University alumni
Association football people from Hiroshima Prefecture
Japanese footballers
Japan Soccer League players
Sanfrecce Hiroshima players
Japanese football managers
J1 League managers
J2 League managers
Sanfrecce Hiroshima managers
FC Gifu managers
FC Imabari managers
Association football midfielders